Sergey Chemerov is a Russian sprint canoeist who competed in the mid to late 1990s. He won four medals at the ICF Canoe Sprint World Championships with a gold (C-4 200 m: 1994), two silvers (C-4 500 m and C-4 1000 m: both 1993), and a bronze (C-4 500 m: 1997).

References

Living people
Russian male canoeists
Year of birth missing (living people)
ICF Canoe Sprint World Championships medalists in Canadian